Nurabad (also Romanized as Nūrābād; also known as Nūrābād-e Qermezī) is a village in Vardasht Rural District, in the Central District of Semirom County, Isfahan Province, Iran. At the 2006 census, its population was 100, in 25 families.

References 

Populated places in Semirom County